Epimetasia rhodobaphialis is a moth in the family Crambidae. It was described by Ragonot in 1894. It is found in Uzbekistan.

References

Moths described in 1894
Odontiini